"I'm Not Trading" is a song by the British industrial music/hard rock band Sunna with an unorthodox '5' beat time signature.

Track listing 

"I'm Not Trading" - 3:50
"Grave (Live In Chicago)" - 4:06
"I'm Not Trading (UNKLE - In Utero)" - 4:11

Bonus tracks
"I'm Not Trading (Radio Edit)" - 3:38 (United States Bonus track)

Chart positions

External links
 Video of I'm Not Trading

2001 songs
Sunna (band) songs
Virgin Records singles
2000 songs
Astralwerks singles
Songs written by Neil Davidge